Komsomolsky District (Komsomolski rayonĕ) is an administrative and municipal district (raion), one of the twenty-one in the Chuvash Republic, Russia. It is located in the southeast of the republic and borders with Kanashsky District in the north, Yalchiksky District and the Republic of Tatarstan in the east, Batyrevsky District in the south, and with Ibresinsky District in the west. Its administrative center is the rural locality (a selo) of Komsomolskoye. Population:  The population of Komsomolskoye accounts for 18.2% of the district's total population.

History
The district was formed on February 22, 1939.

Famous people 
 Victor Nemtsev — Folk's artist of the Chuvash Republic.
 Valerie Tourgay — Folk's Poet of the Chuvash Republic (2003)

References

Notes

Sources
 
 

Districts of Chuvashia
